Helios Arena, originally known as Eisstadion am Bauchenberg, is an arena in Villingen-Schwenningen, Germany.  It is primarily used for ice hockey, and is the home to the Schwenninger Wild Wings of the DEL.  It opened in 1976 and holds 6,215 spectators.

References

External links

Indoor arenas in Germany
Indoor ice hockey venues in Germany
Buildings and structures in Schwarzwald-Baar-Kreis
Sports venues in Baden-Württemberg
Schwenninger Wild Wings
1976 establishments in West Germany
Sports venues completed in 1976
Villingen-Schwenningen